This is a list of universities and colleges in Shenyang, Liaoning Province, China:

 Liaoning University
 Liaoning University of Traditional Chinese Medicine
 Northeastern University (China)
 Shenyang Aerospace University
 Shenyang Jianzhu University
 Shenyang Ligong University
 Shenyang Normal University 
 Shenyang University
 Shenyang University of Technology

Shenyang
Universities and colleges in Shenyang